1-Aminopropan-2-ol is the organic compound with the formula CH3CH(OH)CH2NH2.  It is an amino alcohol. The term isopropanolamine may also refer more generally to the additional homologs diisopropanolamine (DIPA) and triisopropanolamine (TIPA).

1-Aminopropan-2-ol is chiral. It can be prepared by the addition of aqueous ammonia to propylene oxide.

Biosynthesis
(R)-1-Aminopropan-2-ol is one of the components incorporated in the biosynthesis of cobalamin.  The O-phosphate ester is produced from threonine by the enzyme Threonine-phosphate decarboxylase.

Applications
The isopropanolamines are used as buffers. They are good solubilizers of oil and fat, so they are used to neutralize fatty acids and sulfonic acid-based surfactants.
Racemic 1-aminopropan-2-ol is typically used in metalworking fluid, waterborne coatings, personal care products, and in the production of titanium dioxide and polyurethanes. It is an intermediate in the synthesis of a variety of pharmaceutical drugs.

(R)-1-aminopropan-2-ol is metabolised to aminoacetone by the enzyme (R)-aminopropanol dehydrogenase.

Synthesis of Hexylcaine is one application.

References

Amines
Secondary alcohols
Amino alcohols